Clément Halet (born 21 May 1984 in Strasbourg) is a French retired footballer.

References

Clement Halet beendet seine Laufbahn sofort‚ fupa.net, 19 January 2016

External links
 

1984 births
Living people
Footballers from Strasbourg
French footballers
Stade Lavallois players
1. FC Saarbrücken players
Fortuna Düsseldorf players
VfR Aalen players
SC Preußen Münster players
FC 08 Homburg players
2. Bundesliga players
3. Liga players
Association football defenders